The Hale-Byrnes House is a historic home located at 606 Stanton-Christiana Road, Stanton, New Castle County, Delaware.  It was built in 1750, and is a two-story, five bay brick dwelling. The house was built by Samuel Hale, who sold it to Daniel Byrnes in 1754. The house gained historic stature after the Battle of Cooch's Bridge, the only Revolutionary War battle in Delaware. After the skirmish General George Washington held a council at the house on September 6, 1777. The house is also the location of the 300-year-old George Washington Witness Tree of Delaware.

The site is listed on the National Register of Historic Places.

The house is open to the public on the first Wednesday of each month from 12 to 3 PM, and at other times by appointment.  The house is also available for rental.

See also
List of Washington's Headquarters during the Revolutionary War

References

External links

Official Website: George Washington Witness Tree of Delaware Museum

Historic American Buildings Survey in Delaware
Houses on the National Register of Historic Places in Delaware
1777 in Delaware
Historic house museums in Delaware
Museums in New Castle County, Delaware
Houses in New Castle County, Delaware
Houses completed in 1750
Delaware in the American Revolution
National Register of Historic Places in New Castle County, Delaware